Venai (also Romanized as Venā’ī; also known as Vahā’ī) is a village in Qilab Rural District, Alvar-e Garmsiri District, Andimeshk County, Khuzestan Province, Iran. At the 2006 census, its population was 142, in 27 families.

References 

Populated places in Andimeshk County